Lawrence Papaleo is an American soccer coach and former player.

Career

He netted his first college goal for Syracuse Orange in a 1–2 defeat to Hartwick College.

Trialling with Bałtyk Gdynia of the Polish third tier in 2012 for one week, Papaleo signed for the club, getting his work permit in February. Despite not being able to speak Polish, he was able to communicate to his teammates as they spoke English and helped him ensconce into the team.

Personal life
The son of Joe and Maureen Papaleo, he has two sisters. Besides soccer clubs, Papaleo supports the American football team Dallas Cowboys and the New York Yankees baseball team.

Honors

High school
Second-team all state(1)
All-Central New York(1)
Conference Player of the Year(1)
Offensive Player of the Year(2)
Team MVP
Red Bulls High School Cup participation

College
East co-Rookie of the Week(1): 2008 (Albany)
BIG EAST All-Academic Team(2): 2009, 2010 (Syracuse)
Orange Alumni Award(1): 2010
 SU Athletic Director's Honor Roll(5): 2009, 2010, 2011 (Syracuse)

References

External links
 at Soccerway

American soccer coaches
American soccer players
American expatriate soccer players
Association football forwards
Bałtyk Gdynia players
Living people
1989 births
Expatriate footballers in Poland
American expatriate sportspeople in Poland
Soccer players from Dallas